Cyperus orgadophilus is a sedge of the family Cyperaceae that is native to Australia, in Western Australia, the Northern Territory, and Queensland.

It is found in low-lying areas in sandy soils over laterite.

The species was first described in 1991 by Karen Wilson.

See also
List of Cyperus species

References

Plants described in 1991
Flora of Western Australia
orgadophilus
Taxa named by Karen Louise Wilson